Nawaraj Silwal is a Nepalese Politician, former DIG of Nepal Police and serving as the Member Of House Of Representatives (Nepal) elected from Lalitpur-1, Province No. 3. He is member of the Nepal Communist Party.

References

Living people
Place of birth missing (living people)
21st-century Nepalese politicians
People from Lalitpur District, Nepal
Nepal Communist Party (NCP) politicians
Communist Party of Nepal (Unified Marxist–Leninist) politicians
Nepal MPs 2017–2022
Nepalese police officers
1963 births